Yuri Anatolievich Poteyenko (born December 5, 1960)  is a Russian film composer. Four times the winner of the Golden Eagle Award for the best film  music   (2010, 2013, 2016, 2018).

Selected filmography

 Night Watch (2004)
 Popsa (2005)
 Day Watch (2006)
 The Russian Game (2007)
 The Irony of Fate 2 (2007)
 Vanechka (2007)
 The Inhabited Island (2009)
 The Inhabited Island. Skirmish (2009)
 The Salamander Key (2011)
 Spy (2012)
 White Tiger (2013)
 Metro (2013)
Devil's Pass (2013)
 Battalion (2015) 
 The Age of Pioneers (2017) 
 Anna Karenina: Vronsky's Story (2017)
 Saving Leningrad (2019)
 Goalkeeper of the Galaxy (2019)
 V2. Escape from Hell (2021)

References

External links

1960 births
People from Molodohvardiysk
Living people
Russian composers
Russian male composers
Moscow Conservatory alumni
Soviet film score composers
Russian film score composers
Russian music educators
Academic staff of Moscow Conservatory
20th-century Russian male musicians